The Chauvenet Prize is the highest award for mathematical expository writing. It consists of a prize of $1,000 and a certificate, and is awarded yearly by the Mathematical Association of America in recognition of an outstanding expository article on a mathematical topic.  The prize is named in honor of William Chauvenet and was established through a gift from J. L. Coolidge in 1925. The Chauvenet Prize was the first award established by the Mathematical Association of America. A gift from MAA president Walter B. Ford in 1928 allowed the award to be given every 3 years instead of the originally planned 5 years.

Winners 

1925 G. A. Bliss
1929 T. H. Hildebrandt
1932 G. H. Hardy
1935 Dunham Jackson
1938 G. T. Whyburn
1941 Saunders Mac Lane
1944 R. H. Cameron
1947 Paul Halmos
1950 Mark Kac
1953 E. J. McShane
1956 Richard H. Bruck
1960 Cornelius Lanczos
1963 Philip J. Davis
1964 Leon Henkin
1965 Jack K. Hale & Joseph P. LaSalle
1967 Guido Weiss
1968 Mark Kac
1970 Shiing Shen Chern
1971 Norman Levinson
1972 Jean Francois Treves
1973 Carl D. Olds
1974 Peter D. Lax
1975 Martin Davis and Reuben Hersh
1976 Lawrence Zalcman
1977 W. Gilbert Strang
1978 Shreeram S. Abhyankar
1979 Neil J. A. Sloane
1980 Heinz Bauer
1981 Kenneth I. Gross
1982 No award given.
1983 No award given.
1984 R. Arthur Knoebel
1985 Carl Pomerance
1986 George Miel
1987 James H. Wilkinson
1988 Steve Smale
1989 Jacob Korevaar
1990 David Allen Hoffman
1991 W. B. Raymond Lickorish and Kenneth C. Millett
1992 Steven G. Krantz
1993 David H. Bailey, Jonathan M. Borwein and Peter B. Borwein
1994 Barry Mazur
1995 Donald G. Saari
1996 Joan Birman
1997 Tom Hawkins
1998 Alan Edelman and Eric Kostlan
1999 Michael I. Rosen
2000 Don Zagier
2001 Carolyn S. Gordon and David L. Webb
2002 Ellen Gethner, Stan Wagon, and Brian Wick
2003 Thomas C. Hales
2004 Edward B. Burger
2005 John Stillwell
2006 Florian Pfender & Günter M. Ziegler
2007 Andrew J. Simoson
2008 Andrew Granville
2009 Harold P. Boas
2010 Brian J. McCartin
2011 Bjorn Poonen
2012 Dennis DeTurck, Herman Gluck, Daniel Pomerleano & David Shea Vela-Vick
2013 Robert Ghrist
2014 Ravi Vakil
2015 Dana Mackenzie
2016 Susan Marshall & Donald R. Smith
2017 Mark Schilling 
2018 Daniel J. Velleman
2019 Tom Leinster
2020 Vladimir Pozdnyakov, J. Michael Steele
2021 Travis Kowalski
 2022 William Dunham, Ezra Brown & Matthew Crawford

Source: Mathematical Association of America

See also
 List of mathematics awards

References

Awards established in 1925
Awards of the Mathematical Association of America